Fresnes may refer to the following places in France:

Fresnes, Côte-d'Or, in the Côte-d'Or département 
Fresnes, Loir-et-Cher, in the Loir-et-Cher département 
Fresnes, Yonne, in the Yonne département 
Fresnes, Val-de-Marne, in the Val-de-Marne département
Fresnes-au-Mont, in the Meuse département 
Fresnes-en-Saulnois, in the Moselle département 
Fresnes-en-Tardenois, in the Aisne département 
Fresnes-en-Woëvre, in the Meuse département 
Fresnes-lès-Montauban, in the Pas-de-Calais département 
Fresnes-Mazancourt, in the Somme département 
Fresnes-sous-Coucy, in the Aisne département 
Fresnes-sur-Apance, in the Haute-Marne département 
Fresnes-sur-Escaut, in the Nord département
Fresnes-sur-Marne, in the Seine-et-Marne département 
Fresnes-Tilloloy, in the Somme département

See also
Fresnes Prison
Fresne (disambiguation)